Nothomb may refer to:

People
Charles-Ferdinand Nothomb
Jean-Baptiste Nothomb
Patrick Nothomb
Amélie Nothomb
Juliette Nothomb
Pierre Nothomb

Other
, municipality in Belgium
, a tributary of the Attert